Ute is a city in Monona County, Iowa, United States, along the Soldier River. The population was 338 at the time of the 2020 census.

History
A post office called Ute has been in operation since 1876. The city was named after the Ute people.

Geography
Ute is located at  (42.049711, -95.705879).

Demographics

2010 census
As of the census of 2010, there were 374 people, 179 households, and 102 families living in the city. The racial makeup of the city was 98.7% White, 0.3% African American, 0.5% Native American, and 0.5% from two or more races. Hispanic or Latino of any race were 0.8% of the population.

There were 179 households, of which 21.8% had children under the age of 18 living with them, 44.1% were married couples living together, 9.5% had a female householder with no husband present, 3.4% had a male householder with no wife present, and 43.0% were non-families. 36.3% of all households were made up of individuals, and 18.5% had someone living alone who was 65 years of age or older. The average household size was 2.09 and the average family size was 2.70.

The median age in the city was 49.8 years. 19.5% of residents were under the age of 18; 7% were between the ages of 18 and 24; 16% were from 25 to 44; 31.5% were from 45 to 64; and 25.9% were 65 years of age or older. The gender makeup of the city was 48.4% male and 51.6% female.

2000 census
As of the census of 2000, there were 378 people, 183 households, and 112 families living in the city. The racial makeup of the city was 99.74% White and 0.26% African American.

There were 183 households, out of which 19.1% had children under the age of 18 living with them, 54.1% were married couples living together, 6.0% had a female householder with no husband present, and 38.3% were non-families. 34.4% of all households were made up of individuals, and 20.8% had someone living alone who was 65 years of age or older. The average household size was 2.07 and the average family size was 2.61.

In the city, the population was spread out, with 17.7% under the age of 18, 4.8% from 18 to 24, 19.6% from 25 to 44, 24.3% from 45 to 64, and 33.6% who were 65 years of age or older. The median age was 53 years. For every 100 females, there were 86.2 males. For every 100 females age 18 and over, there were 84.0 males.

The median income for a household in the city was $30,875, and the median income for a family was $36,250. Males had a median income of $31,000 versus $21,250 for females. The per capita income for the city was $16,650. About 7.5% of families and 9.9% of the population were below the poverty line, including 16.0% of those under age 18 and 8.3% of those age 65 or over.

Education
Charter Oak–Ute Community School District operates public schools.

References

Cities in Monona County, Iowa
Cities in Iowa